Tarantallegra is the first Korean studio album by JYJ member Kim Junsu, released on May 14, 2012. It was the first album he released as a solo artist under the stage name XIA, and became one of the highest selling solo albums in 2012 on the Gaon chart.

Composition
Xia participated in the producing, composing, and writing lyrics for most of the twelve songs.

Release and promotion
On May 10, ahead of the album's release, Xia released "사랑이 싫다구요 (I Don't Like Love)", a song used as the soundtrack for Korean drama "Rooftop Prince".
On May 14, C-JeS published the music video for "Tarantallegra", with choreography by Jeri Slaughter, an American choreographer whom Xia has previously worked with.

On June 11, Xia released the dance version music video for "Tarantallegra". Unlike the original music video, the new version video focuses on the visuals and the choreography. It also contains previously unseen footage.

Reception
On May 4, shortly after pre-orders for Tarantallegra began on both online and offline stores, the online music market site Synnara experienced a server crash due to the sudden, overwhelming response. Xia's agency, C-JeS Entertainment revealed that the album has reached 100,000 copies in pre-orders. It also topped Japan's iTunes' pop albums chart without any promotion. The album is revealed to have had a greater reaction from fans than anticipated, leading to sell-outs. According to Gaon, 122,000 copies of the album has been sold as of the end of May.

Repackaged version
On July 16, along with an announcement of a worldwide tour, Xia revealed that he's currently working on a repackaged album which will be aimed for the world market. The repackaged version will include an English single and its music video will be produced in the U.S. C-JeS Entertainment stated that renowned staff members in America will be taking part in the new album and music video. Xia will then embark on a world tour covering North America, South America and Europe with plans to make stops in two or three cities per continent.
Instead of a repackaged album, however, Xia released a single album entitled Uncommitted.

Xia 1st Asia Tour Concert – Tarantallegra

XIA 1st World Tour Concert is the first solo concert tour by JYJ's member Kim Junsu in support of his debut solo album Tarantallegra, which was released on May 14, 2012. The tour kicked off its first show in Seoul, South Korea on May 19, 2012, at Seoul's Jamsil Indoor Stadium. According to MTV K, XIA was "the first South Korean male artist to embark on a true world tour". His tour includes stops in Thailand, Indonesia, the United States, Europe and South America.

The 17,000 tickets for the Seoul concerts were sold out within five minutes of going on sale. The Asian leg of the tour drew an audience of 40,000.

Shows

Track listing

Charts

Singles chart

Album chart

Other charted songs

Sales

Release history

References

External links
 

A&G Modes albums
2012 albums
Korean-language albums
Kim Junsu albums